Centennial Hills Park, formerly known as Deer Springs Park, is a 120-acre regional park in Las Vegas, Nevada, United States, located in the neighborhood of Centennial Hills. It is located next to the Centennial Hills Library.

Activities and amenities

Centennial Hills Park is built on an inverted riverbed, the Tule Springs Wash and features prehistoric-themed trails, as well as two playgrounds, including a shaded playground near the trails for older children known by locals as the "dinosaur playground" and a garden-themed playground for younger children known as the "butterfly playground", each one featuring a splash pad. An amphitheater, a dog park, and soccer and football fields are also included within the park.

References

Parks in Nevada
Parks in Clark County, Nevada